Giovanni Beraldo or Giovanni Beroaldo (died 1565) was a Roman Catholic prelate who served as Bishop of Sant'Agata de' Goti (1557–1565) and Bishop of Telese o Cerreto Sannita (1548–1557).

Biography
On 14 March 1548, Giovanni Beraldo was appointed during the papacy of Pope Paul III as Bishop of Telese o Cerreto Sannita.
On 1 October 1557, he was appointed during the papacy of Pope Paul IV as Bishop of Sant'Agata de' Goti.
He served as Bishop of Sant'Agata de' Goti until his death in 1565.

While bishop, he was the principal co-consecrator of:
Antonio Ghislieri, Bishop of Nepi e Sutri (1556); and
Sigismondo Saraceno, Archbishop of Acerenza e Matera (1556).

References

External links and additional sources
 (Chronology of Bishops) 
 (Chronology of Bishops) 
 (for Chronology of Bishops) 
 (for Chronology of Bishops) 

16th-century Italian Roman Catholic bishops
Bishops appointed by Pope Paul III
Bishops appointed by Pope Paul IV
1565 deaths